Richard Smith CBE FMedSci is a British medical doctor, editor, and businessman.

He is director of the Ovations initiative to combat chronic disease in the developing world. The initiative is funding centres in China, Bangladesh, India, Pakistan, Tunisia, Tanzania, South Africa, Central America, and the US Mexico border. He is also chairman of the board of directors of Patients Know Best.

Previously he was chief executive of UnitedHealth Europe, a subsidiary of the UnitedHealth Group that works with public health systems in Europe. Before that he was editor of the BMJ (previously the British Medical Journal), and chief executive of the BMJ Group. Smith worked for the BMJ for twenty-five years, from 1979 to 2004, the last thirteen as editor.

Smith is a proponent of open access publishing. He was editor of the BMJ when the journal first moved to online publishing, and made the journal's archives freely available.  He sits on the board of directors of the Public Library of Science, an open access publisher of scientific and medical research. He was editor in chief of the open-access Cases Journal, which aimed to create a database of medical case reports.

He is an honorary professor at the University of Warwick and a member of the governing council of St George's, University of London.

He is a founding Fellows of the Academy of Medical Sciences, elected in 1998.

Having qualified in medicine in the University of Edinburgh, he worked in hospitals in Scotland and New Zealand before joining the BMJ. He also worked for six years as a television doctor with the BBC and TV-AM and has a degree in management science from the Stanford Graduate School of Business.

Smith is the author of the book The Trouble with Medical Journals (2006), in which he contends that medical journals have become "creatures of the drug industry", rife with fraudulent research and packed with articles ghost written by pharmaceutical companies. He has also written about the limitations and problems of the peer review process. In 2014, in an interview with New Scientist, he argued for criminalisation of research fraud.

His brother is comedian Arthur Smith.

Views on cancer
In December 2014, Smith wrote on the BMJ blog that trying to find a cure for cancer was a waste of money, claiming that, "with love, morphine, and whisky", the disease is the best way to die.
His remarks provoked outrage. The British Medical Journal said:
Smith’s New Year’s Eve blog on thebmj.com about cancer offering the best death garnered global media coverage and triggered a social media storm from thousands of bereaved relatives and the parents of children with cancer. He was accused of “glibly glossing over the pain” of cancer, to quote Michael Broderick, one of the 173 respondents on thebmj.com.

Smith responded and tried to clarify some of his points in a follow-up blog post on 5 January.

References

External links
 BMJJournals.com – 'Editor of the BMJ to take up new post', Zosia Kmietowicz, British Medical Journal (29 May 2004)
 BMJ Blogs: The BMJ – Richard Smith – Blog of Richard Smith on BMJ

Living people
British writers
Commanders of the Order of the British Empire
Stanford Graduate School of Business alumni
Medical journal editors
Year of birth missing (living people)
People educated at the John Roan School
Fellows of the Academy of Medical Sciences (United Kingdom)